Galauda  is a village in Sri Lanka. It is located within Uva Province.

See also
List of towns in Uva Province, Sri Lanka Galauda is in Uva province

External links

Populated places in Uva Province